Arnór Borg Guðjohnsen (born 16 September 2000) is an Icelandic footballer who plays for Víkingur Reykjavík as a midfielder.

Club career
Guðjohnsen signed for Welsh club Swansea City from Breiðablik in July 2017. He became a regular player for their under-18 Academy side. He suffered an injury in April 2019, and was out of action for 7 months before returning to play in December 2019.

In May 2020 he returned to Iceland to train, and signed for Fylkir in June 2020, after being released by Swansea.

In September 2021 it was announced that he would transfer to Víkingur Reykjavík for the 2022 season.

International career
In September 2018 he was called up by the Icelandic under-19 team.

Playing style
He has described Gylfi Sigurðsson, a fellow Icelandic player who also played for Swansea City, as his idol. Like Sigurðsson he plays behind the strikers.

Personal life
His father Arnór and half-brother Eiður were both footballers, as are Eiður's son Sveinn Aron, and Andri.

References

External links

2000 births
Living people
Icelandic footballers
Breiðablik UBK players
Swansea City A.F.C. players
Fylkir players
Knattspyrnufélagið Víkingur players
Úrvalsdeild karla (football) players
Association football midfielders
Icelandic expatriate footballers
Icelandic expatriates in Wales
Expatriate footballers in Wales
Guðjohnsen family
Iceland youth international footballers